Gran Sasso (Italian for "Large Stone") may refer to any of several nearby locations among Gran Sasso d'Italia, the highest mountain in central Italy:

Isola del Gran Sasso d'Italia, a town in Italy near the mountain;
Gran Sasso e Monti della Laga National Park, which surrounds the town and mountain;
Gran Sasso pass a highway tunnel under the mountain; or
Laboratori Nazionali del Gran Sasso, the largest underground laboratory in the world, under the midpoint of the tunnel.